Associação Atlética Ponte Preta, commonly referred to as simply Ponte Preta, is a Brazilian association football club in Campinas, São Paulo. They currently play in the Série B, the second tier of Brazilian football, as well as in the Campeonato Paulista Série A2, the second tier of the São Paulo state football league.

Ponte Preta is also known as Macaca. Ponte Preta's biggest rival is from the same city, Guarani, against whom matches are known as derby campineiro (dérbi campineiro in Portuguese). They are known as "pontepretanos". Ponte Preta is the second oldest football team established in Brazil still in activity, founded on August 11, 1900, the oldest being Sport Club Rio Grande, of Rio Grande do Sul.

History
Ponte Preta was founded on August 11, 1900, by Colégio Culto à Ciência students Miguel do Carmo (nicknamed "Migué"), Luiz Garibaldi Burghi, (nicknamed "Gigette") and Antonio de Oliveira (nicknamed "Tonico Campeão"), nearby a black painted wood railroad bridge, so the name Ponte Preta (which means "black bridge", in English). Ponte Preta's first president was Pedro Vieira da Silva.

The team's history is directly intertwined with the railroad business that was flourishing in its city of Campinas. Most of the people involved with the foundation of the team were residents of the working-class neighbourhood by the railroad. One of the team's first nicknames was the "Train of August 11th". Ponte's stadium, the Estádio Moisés Lucarelli, is located right by the railroad in a way where it is possible to see it when inside the stadium, and according to the fans, when the train passes by during a game, it is a sign of good luck to come for the team.

Ponte Preta is recognized, by FIFA, as one of the first teams in the Americas to accept black players, since its foundation in 1900. The club claims to be the first football team ever to have a black player in their roster, that player being the before mentioned Miguel do Carmo, who was part of their first squad.
It is also the first countryside team to play a national competition, in 1970.

Pelé's last match in Brazil was against Ponte Preta. On September 2, 1974, at Vila Belmiro stadium, Santos defeated Ponte Preta 2–0.

Ponte Preta lost the Campeonato Paulista final to Corinthians in 1977 in a controversial game that ended in a 2–1 final score. Rui Rey, an important piece of the Ponte Preta team, was shown a red card early in the game. Ponte Preta were considered the favorites for the championship that year.

On November 27, 2013, at the Romildo Ferreira stadium, Ponte Preta reached the 2013 Sudamericana final by defeating São Paulo (4–2 on aggregate) in the semi finals. It was a historical time for the club, which was playing its first international cup. The final was against Lanús, a Traditional Argentine team, with Ponte Preta finishing as runner up.

Honours 

Copa Sudamericana:
 Runners-up (1): 2013

Campeonato Brasileiro Série B:
 Runners-up (2): 1997, 2014

Campeonato Paulista do Interior:
 Winners (4): 2009, 2013, 2015, 2018

Campeonato Paulista Série A2:
 Winners (3): 1927 (LAF Interior), 1933 (APEA Campinas), 1969

Copa São Paulo de Juniores:
 Winners (2): 1981, 1982

Achievements time line

Stadium

Ponte Preta's stadium is Estádio Moisés Lucarelli, also known as "Majestoso", or "Estádio Majestoso" (Portuguese for Majestic Stadium), built in 1948, by its own fan's material and work.

Its maximum capacity is of 19,722 people, nowadays. The biggest public in it was in a State's Championship in 1970, against Santos, with an official public of 33,000, but it is said that there were about 40,000 people, as the gates were broken down.

Its nickname is "Majestoso", meaning the "Majestic One" because it was the third largest stadium in Brazil at the time of its inauguration (only smaller than Pacaembu, in São Paulo and São Januário, in Rio de Janeiro).

In Majestoso's entrance hall there is a bust of the stadium's founder, Moisés Lucarelli (after whom the venue is named) facing the outside. In 2000, after a long series of defeats some superstitious fans argued that the founder ought to see the team playing and the bust was rotated 180 degrees. As the team's performance did not improve noticeably, the statue was put back in its original position.

Supporters
Ponte Preta supporters are known as "pontepretanos". A club from Maceió, Alagoas, adopted a similar name and colors as the Campinas club. There is a Norwegian futsal club named after Ponte Preta.

Rivalry
Associação Atlética Ponte Preta's biggest rival is from the same city: Guarani. The games between Ponte Preta and Guarani, known as derby (dérbi in Portuguese), are usually preceded by a week of tension, provocations and also fights in the city of Campinas.

It is a centenary rivalry (the first being held on March 24, 1912), the greatest in Brazil's countryside and one of the most intense in the whole country.

Symbols
The club's mascot is a female monkey (Macaca) wearing Ponte Preta's home kit. It was initially intended as a derogatory term, reflecting the racism against the club (one of the first Brazilian teams to accept blacks, having been even refused participation in championships due to this) and its fans. This co-option of a derogatory term as team mascot was copied by Palmeiras fans, who adopted the pig as their mascot instead of taking offense from it, and other teams.

Ultras
Torcida Jovem
Serponte

Placar magazine's Silver Ball Prize winners while playing on Ponte Preta

1977 –  Oscar and  Polozzi (defenders)
1978 –  Odirlei (left back)
1980 –  Carlos (goalkeeper)
1981 –  Zé Mario (defensive midfielder)
1982 –  Carlos (goalkeeper) and  Juninho Fonseca (defender)
2000 –  Mineiro (defensive midfielder)

Basketball
Ponte Preta had one of the most powerful teams in the history of Brazilian female Basketball during the early 1990s, winning the World Club Championship twice.

Current squad

Out on loan

Head coaches

 Abel Braga (January 1, 2003 – December 31, 2003)
 Estevam Soares (January 2, 2004 – May 24, 2004)
 Vadão (January 1, 2005 – May 22, 2005)
 Zetti (August 2, 2005 – August 23, 2005)
 Estevam Soares (August 26, 2005 – November 22, 2005)
 Vadão (December 15, 2005 – May 29, 2006)
 Marco Aurélio (May 19, 2006 – October 5, 2006)
 Nelsinho Baptista (January 30, 2007 – September 23, 2007)
 Paulo Comelli (September 24, 2007 – December 3, 2007)
 Sérgio Guedes (2008)
 Paulo Bonamigo (June 11, 2008 – September 27, 2008)
 Vágner Benazzi (October 1, 2008 – December 4, 2008)
 Sérgio Soares (December 4, 2008–11 March 22, 2009)
 Marco Aurélio (March 9, 2009 – May 25, 2009)
 Pintado (May 25, 2009 – August 30, 2009)
 Márcio Bittencourt (August 31, 2009 – October 7, 2009)
 Sérgio Guedes (January 1, 2010 – March 31, 2010)
 Jorginho (April 21, 2010 – October 25, 2010)
 Givanildo Oliveira (October 25, 2010 – December 2, 2010)
 Gilson Kleina (December 3, 2010 – September 18, 2012)
 Guto Ferreira (September 22, 2012 – June 6, 2013)
 Paulo César Carpegiani (June 15, 2013 – August 24, 2013)
 Jorginho (August 25, 2013 – December 13, 2013)
 Sidney Moraes (December 15, 2013 – January 30, 2014)
 Vadão (January 31, 2014 – May 13, 2014)
 Dado Cavalcanti (May 13, 2014 – July 21, 2014)
 Guto Ferreira (2014–2015)
 Doriva (2015)
 Vinícius Eutrópio (2016)
 Gilson Kleina (2017)
 Eduardo Baptista (2017-2018)
 Marcelo Chamusca (2018)
 Jorginho (2019-)

See also
 Ponte Preta Sumaré Futebol Clube

References

Websites

Books
O Início de uma Paixão: a fundação e os primeiros anos da Associação Atlética Ponte Preta, José Moraes dos Santos Neto, Editora Komedi, 2000
História da Associação Atlética Ponte Preta, em sete volumes: 1900–2000, Sérgio Rossi, R. Vieira Gráfica, 2001

External links

 

 
Association football clubs established in 1900
Sport in Campinas
Football clubs in São Paulo (state)
1900 establishments in Brazil